Maternal Secrets is a 2018 American-Bermudan strong woman thriller television film, set in the Caribbean Bermuda. It is directed by Lucinda Spurling and stars Kate Mansi. Kelly McGillis, Brooke Burfitt, Sean Stolzen and Luann de Lesseps.
The film was filmed under the working title "Babymoon", but the film trailer was released in June under a new title "Mother Of All Secrets". It got its Lifetime (TV network) debut on May 9, 2020.

Synopsis
When a state senator goes missing on vacation in Bermuda, his pregnant girlfriend Aubrey searches for answers. What she learns is his estranged mother is on the island and knows more about the disappearance than she is letting on.

Production 

The film was shot in January/February 2017 on the island of Bermuda. It is the first film to be shot on the island in over twenty-five years. The film was co-written and directed by Lucinda Spurling and Louise Burfitt-Dons and produced by Brooke Williams. Kate Mansi told Soap Opera Digest she was most proud that it "was the largest female cast & crew I have ever worked with so far."

References

External links
 

American thriller films
2010s thriller films
American independent films
Films set in Bermuda
2018 television films
Lifetime (TV network) films
2018 films
Films shot in Bermuda
2010s American films